Ben Rappaport (born ) is an American actor. He played the role of Todd Dempsy in the NBC sitcom Outsourced, which aired during the 2010–11 television season. The series marked Rappaport's debut acting role on screen.

Life and career

Rappaport was born in Arlington, Texas, and was active in the arts (painting and playing guitar) during his childhood. He was raised in the Jewish religion, and his Jewish identity is important to him. He attended Klein High School near Houston. Rappaport developed an interest in acting at the age of fifteen, and subsequently graduated from the Juilliard School in New York City where he studied acting. He was the recipient of the Michel and Suria Saint-Denis Prize as a Juilliard student, which is the Drama Department's highest honor.

Rappaport was featured in a Kay Jeweler's holiday commercial. The ad was well known because it prominently featured sign language and a deaf character. In 2010, Rappaport was cast in the lead role as Todd Dempsy in the NBC sitcom Outsourced. The role marked Rappaport's first on-screen acting job. Rappaport had previously performed in theater and stage productions. He resides in Studio City, Los Angeles.

He was a series regular in the Shondaland drama For the People.

Filmography

References

External links

 

1980s births
21st-century American male actors
American male film actors
American male television actors
Jewish American male actors
Juilliard School alumni
Living people
Male actors from New York City
Male actors from Texas
People from Arlington, Texas
People from Klein, Texas
People from Studio City, Los Angeles
Klein High School alumni
21st-century American Jews